François Gendron (born November 3, 1944 in Val-Paradis, Quebec) is a politician and teacher in Quebec, Canada. He was a Member of National Assembly of Quebec for the riding of Abitibi-Ouest. He has represented the Parti Québécois from 1976 to 2018.

Gendron went to the Université Laval and obtained diplomas in pedagogy and administration. He was then a teacher at Cité Étudiante Polyno in La Sarre, a coordinator at the Commission scolaire Lalonde, and an education School counsellor. He was a municipal councillor from 1973 to 1976 in La Sarre and was the founder of the Education Workers Union of Northwestern Quebec in 1967.

Gendron is the longest active MNA serving, as he was elected for the first time in 1976 when the Parti Québécois led by René Lévesque was elected the government for the first time. He was named the Assistant Whip and then the Minister of Public Services. After his 1981 re-election, he was named the Minister of Planning, Minister of Planning and Development and Minister of Education (1984–1985).

After the Parti Québécois returned to the opposition benches after the 1985 elections, he was the Deputy Opposition House Leader from 1985 to 1987 and 1989 to 1994 and the Opposition House Leader from 1987 to 1989. He was also the critic after the 1989 elections for education, municipal and regional affairs.

When the Parti Québécois returned to power in 1994 with Jacques Parizeau as their leader, he was named Minister of Natural resources and the Deputy Government House Leader. In 1996, he was named the Government Chair Caucus. He remained in that position after the 1998 elections until 2002 where he was briefly the Minister of Forest Management and rurality and then the Minister of Natural Resources.

Gendron was re-elected in the 2003 and 2007 general elections and was the National Assembly's Third Vice-President (Third Deputy Speaker of the House) from 2003 to 2007.

On May 9, 2007, Gendron was elected acting leader of the Parti Québécois over Marie Malavoy, following the resignation of André Boisclair.

During his tenure as acting leader, he played a major role in the adoption of the 2007 budget tabled by Liberal Finance Minister Monique Jérôme-Forget, as it was during a Liberal minority government. The Parti Québécois had requested additional funding for health, education and the regions as well as a reduction of the income tax cuts that were planned by the Liberals to be $950 million. The Liberals accepted an increase total funding of $111 million without reducing the tax cut and have increased taxes for oil and bank companies. Gendron and the PQ mentioned that the funding was not sufficient to vote for the budget, but only Gendron, House Leader Diane Lemieux and Finance critic François Legault took part of the vote in which the budget passed 46–44 on June 1, 2007.

On August 20, 2007, an article from La Presse reported that Gendron would replace Diane Lemieux as the House Leader of the second opposition group when the National Assembly of Quebec resumed in October 2007.

On October 21, 2008, Gendron was named the President of the National Assembly of Quebec, a position equivalent to Speaker in other legislatures. Initially, Maxime Arseneau was the PQ candidate for the position as well as Marc Picard for the Action démocratique du Québec and Yvon Vallières for the Liberals. After Picard and Arseneau dropped their candidacy,  both opposition parties supported the nomination of Gendron. He is the first MNA from an opposition party to be named as President of the National Assembly since 1887. He would serve in that capacity until after the 2008 provincial election.

He is currently the longest-serving member of the National Assembly, served for 42 years.

See also
 Presidents of the National Assembly of Quebec

Footnotes

External links

1944 births
French Quebecers
Living people
People from Abitibi-Témiscamingue
Parti Québécois MNAs
Université Laval alumni
Leaders of the Parti Québécois
Deputy premiers of Quebec
Vice Presidents of the National Assembly of Quebec
21st-century Canadian politicians
Presidents of the National Assembly of Quebec